Ationg Tituh is a Malaysian politician from Sabah region. He is the one who established and started the Parti Gagasan Rakyat Sabah (GAGASAN), and also the inaugural president of the local party on 28 August 2013. His political party is among the 20 official political parties registered in 2013.

Election results

References

Sabah State Legislative Assembly
Malaysian politicians
Year of birth missing (living people)
Living people